Preobrazhensky (masculine), Preobrazhenskaya (feminine), or Preobrazhenskoye (neuter), literally meaning "of the Transfiguration", may refer to:

People
Preobrazhensky (surname) (Preobrazhenskaya)

Places
Preobrazhensky (rural locality) (Preobrazhenskaya, Preobrazhenskoye), several rural localities in Russia
Preobrazhensky Metro Bridge, the shortest rail bridge in Moscow, Russia

Preobrazhenskoye District, a district of Eastern Administrative Okrug in the federal city of Moscow, Russia
Preobrazhenskoye Cemetery, a cemetery in Moscow, Russia
Preobrazhensky Bridge, a railway and road bridge in Zaporizhzhia, Ukraine

Other
Preobrazhensky Regiment, one of the oldest regiments of the Imperial Russian army, recreated in 2013 for the Russian Armed Forces
Preobrazhensky prikaz (ru), an establishment (prikaz) that oversaw the Preobrazhensky and Semyonovsky Regiments in the 18th century
154th Preobrazhensky Independent Commandant's Regiment, the official honor guard of the Russian Armed Forces

See also
Preobrazhenskaya Ploshchad, a Moscow Metro station, Moscow, Russia